Tracey Rowland (born 1963) is an Australian Roman Catholic theologian and professor at the University of Notre Dame Australia. She was appointed to Pope Francis' International Theological Commission in 2014 and in 2020 became the first Australian, and third woman, to be awarded the Ratzinger Prize for theology.

Life and career 
Tracey Rowland was born in 1963 and educated by the Sisters of Mercy in Ipswich, Queensland, and at The Range Convent and High School in Rockhampton. She initially studied law and government at the University of Queensland and earned a Bachelor of Laws in 1989. She then studied at the University of Melbourne, where she obtained a Bachelor of Letters in philosophy and a Master of Arts degree in political philosophy in 1992, as well as a graduate diploma in German language and the Goethe Institute's Certificate of German as a Foreign Language the following year. After winning a Commonwealth doctoral scholarship Rowland attended the University of Cambridge where she completed her PhD in 2001. Her doctoral dissertation was on twentieth century theological engagements with the idea of culture, with reference to the philosophy of Alasdair MacIntyre and the theology of Henri de Lubac and Joseph Ratzinger.

In 2001 she became the inaugural dean of the Pontifical John Paul II Institute for Studies on Marriage and Family in Melbourne, a role she held until 2017. During this period she continued her theological studies at the Pontifical Lateran University, where she obtained her Licentiate in Sacred Theology and a Doctorate in Sacred Theology. In 2010 she also graduated from the University of London with a degree in education. In 2017, Rowland was appointed as the St John Paul II Research Professor at the University of Notre Dame Australia. She is a dame of the Order of the Holy Sepulchre and a dame of the Order of Knights of the Hospital of Saint John of Jerusalem, Rhodes and Malta, commonly known as the Knights Hospitaller. In 2014 she was appointed as a member of Pope Francis' International Theological Commission. In 2016 she delivered the prestigious Cardinal Winning Memorial Lecture at the University of Glasgow in Scotland. In 2020 Rowland won the Ratzinger Prize for Theology, making her the first Australian and only the third woman to ever receive this award. An annual award to two individuals, and coming with AUD$125,000 prize money, Pope Francis announced in October 2020 that Rowland would share the award with French philosopher Jean-Luc Marion.

A reviewer of her second book, Ratzinger's faith, notes that the volume "is an important contribution to understanding not only Ratzinger the theologian but also the Roman Catholic Church after Vatican II--and the challenges and opportunities the church specifically and the Christian faith generally face in the early 21st century".  Reviewers of her book Catholic Theology have said that it is "a work which deserves wide readership" and that "we are indebted to Tracey Rowland for this significant theological achievement and valuable teaching resource".

Rowland has published over 150 articles in all and has editored a collection of essays on Anglican patrimony for publication with Bloomsbury, a collection of essays on the subject of healing fractures in fundamental theology (with Peter McGregor) and a book on early to mid-20th-century German theology with a special focus on the mentors of the Ratzinger generation, Illuminating Hope: Defenders of Christian Humanism after Kant and Nietzsche (London: Bloomsbury, 2021).

Awards 
 2009: Archbishop Michael J Miller Award for the Promotion of Faith and Culture from the University of St. Thomas in Houston
 2012: Officer's Cross of the Order of Merit of the Republic of Poland
 2020: Joseph Ratzinger Prize

Select publications

References

External links 

Living people
Australian Roman Catholic theologians
University of Notre Dame Australia people
Officers of the Order of Merit of the Republic of Poland
Members of the Order of the Holy Sepulchre
Ratzinger Prize laureates
1963 births